The Boy on the Seahorse , commonly known as El caballito, is a sculpture by Rafael Zamarripa. Two versions are installed in Puerto Vallarta, in the Mexican state of Jalisco; one along the Malecón in Centro and another at Playa de los Muertos in Zona Romántica.

One of the existing sculptures along the Malecón, installed in 1976, replaced a smaller version which was erected at Playa de los Muertos in the late 1960s but later swept away by a storm. The work has been described as an icon of the city.

References

External links

 

Animal sculptures in Mexico
Centro, Puerto Vallarta
Fish in art
Outdoor sculptures in Puerto Vallarta
Sculptures of children
Statues in Jalisco
Zona Romántica